The following is a list of Ukrainian-language poets.

18th century 
Hryhori Skovoroda – Kharkiv Oblast

19th century 
Taras Shevchenko – Zvenyhorodsky Raion, Cherkasy Oblast
Ivan Franko – Yavorivskyi Raion, Lviv Oblast
Leonid Hlibov – Khorolskyi Raion, Poltava Oblast
Yevhen Hrebinka – Ubizhyshche, (today – Marianivka), Poltava Governorate 
Levko Borovykovsky – Myliushky, Poltava Governorate 
Ivan Vahylevych – village of Yasen (today in Kalush Raion), Stanisławów Powiat, Kingdom of Galicia and Lodomeria 
Markiyan Shashkevych – Pidlyssia, Złoczów Powiat, Kingdom of Galicia and Lodomeria
Panteleimon Kulish – Voronizh (now in Sumy Oblast)
Yuriy Fedkovych – Putyla (now in Chernivtsi Oblast)
Pavlo Chubynsky – village Hora, Pereyaslav county, Poltava Governorate

20th century 
Mykola Khvylovy – Trostianets, Sumy Oblast
Olena Teliha – Moscow, Russia
Pavlo Tychyna – Chernihiv Oblast
Lesya Ukrainka – Zviahel, Zhytomyr Oblast
Mykola Zerov – Zinkiv, Poltava Oblast
Maksym Rylsky – Kyiv
Ivan Bahrianyi – Okhtyrskyi Raion, Sumy Oblast
Volodymyr Sosiura – Debaltseve, Yekaterinoslav Governorate (today Donbas region)
Bohdan Ihor Antonych – Nowica
Vasyl Holoborodko – Adrianopil
Moisey Fishbeyn – Kyiv
Natalka Bilotserkivets – Kyiv
Emma Andijewska – Donetsk
Yuri Andrukhovych – Ivano-Frankivsk
Lina Kostenko – Rzhyschiv, Kyiv Oblast
Yaroslav Pavulyak – Ternopil Oblast
Vasyl Stus – Haisynskyi Raion, Vinnytsia Oblast
Roman Kudlyk – Jarosław, Poland
Taras Chubay – Lviv
Bohdana Durda – Buchach
Semyon Gudzenko – Kyiv
Leonid Vysheslavsky - Kyiv
Ihor Pavlyuk – Kyiv
Yuriy Ruf – Lviv
Oleh Lysheha – Tysmenytsia, Ivano-Frankivsk Oblast
Natalia Liwycka-Chołodna – Zolotonosha
Iryna Senyk – Boryslav
Atena Pashko – Drohobych Raion

21st century 
 Yaryna Chornohuz
 Daria Chubata – Ternopil
 Eugenia Chuprina – Kyiv
 Marianna Kiyanovska – Zhovkva
 Iya Kiva – Donetsk
 Myroslav Laiuk – Kyiv
 Kateryna Mikhalitsyna – Mlyniv
 Halyna Petrosanyak – Ukrainian Carpathians
 Mariana Savka – Kopychyntsi
 Iryna Shuvalova – Kyiv
 Lyuba Yakimchuk – Donbas
 Tetiana Yakovenko – Sobolivka
 Serhiy Zhadan – Donbas

References 

Ukrainian
 
poets